Jacob de Graeff (28 June 1642 in Amsterdam – 21 April 1690) was a member of the De Graeff-family from the Dutch Golden Age. He was an Amsterdam Regent and held the titles as  20.th Lord of the Free and high Fief Ilpendam and Purmerland. Jacob de Graeff was a member of a family of regents who belonged to the republican political movement also referred to as the ‘state oriented’, as opposed to the Royalists.

Biography
Jacob was the son of Cornelis de Graeff and Catharina Hooft, and the younger brother of Pieter de Graeff. In 1648 Jacob laid the foundation stone for the new city hall on the Dam. Joost van den Vondel wrote a poem to Jacobs Foundation stone. During the summers the family spent a lot of their time at the Palace Soestdijk, and he and his brother played with the young William III of Orange – who later became King of England, Scotland and Ireland and stadtholder of the United Provinces of the Netherlands – at the lake and woods at Soestdijk. After he finished his studies at the University of Harderwijk he returned to Amsterdam. In 1666 he married Maria van der Does. Maria died 3 months later and they had no children.

In 1672 Jacob became a member of the Government of the City of Amsterdam. He was a political advisor to his cousin Johan De Witt. In the rampjaar 1672, after the death of the brothers De Witt and the raise of the House of Orange, the republican-minded faction of the De Graeff family included Jacob and Pieter, their uncle Andries de Graeff and their nephew Lambert Reynst, lost their political positions. In 1674 Jacob sold the hunting lodge and its surrounding fields, now the Soestdijk Palace, for only 18,755 Guilder to William III, and became one of the princes captains in the battle at Reibach near Bonn. In the same year Jacob owned 260.000 Guilder. About that he was one of the richest persons from the Dutch Golden Age. In 1678 Jacob inherited the high Lordship of Purmerland and Ilpendam from his full aunt Maria Overlander van Purmerland, which he owned half with his mother Catharina, who was also Maria's full cousin.

Jacob was like his father Cornelis a man who surrounded himself with art and beauty. He was an art collector and patron to some famous artists. Jacob was painted by Gerard Ter Borch, Jacob Isaakszoon van Ruisdael, Thomas de Keyser, Karel Dujardin and Jan Victors and sing by the poet Joost van den Vondel. Jacob owned the castle Ilpenstein. He died 1690; his tomb chapel is to be found in the Oude Kerk at Amsterdam.

Notes

Literature
 Elias, Johan E. (1903–1905) De vroedschap van Amsterdam, 1578–1795, Haarlem (herdruk 1963, uitgeverij Israël, Amsterdam)
 Zandvliet, Kees (2006) De 250 rijksten van de Gouden Eeuw: kapitaal, macht, familie en levensstijl, p. 97, uitgeverij Nieuw Amsterdam, Amsterdam, 
 Moelker, H.P. (1978) De heerlijkheid Purmerland en Ilpendam, p. 158–166, uitgeverij Nooy, Purmerend (2e druk)
 Graeff, P. DE (P. Gerritsz de Graeff en Dirk de Graeff van Polsbroek) Genealogie van de familie De Graeff van Polsbroek, Amsterdam 1882
 Bruijn, J. H. DE Genealogie van het geslacht De Graeff van Polsbroek 1529/1827

External links

 Jacob de Graeffs Biography at Biographisch woordenboek der Nederlanden. Part 2
 Jacob de Graeff at Heren van Holland
 Dedalo Carasso, 'Helden van het vaderland' at the DBNL
 Catharina Hooft and her sons Jacob and Pieter de Graeff at Vrouwen van Soestdijk
 Vondel, Joost van den: Adonias of Rampzalige Kroonzucht, Vers about Jacob de Graeff

Jacob, de Graeff
17th-century Dutch politicians
Politicians from Amsterdam
16th-century Dutch businesspeople
Lords of Purmerland and Ilpendam
1642 births
1690 deaths